Rhonda Cator (born 23 August 1966) is a retired female badminton player from Australia.

Career
Cator competed in badminton at the 1992 Summer Olympics in women's doubles with Anna Lao, and they lost in quarterfinal to Lin Yan Fen and Yao Fen. The same year, they won the French Open.  She also competed at the 1996 and 2000 Olympics.

Domestically, Cator has won the national championship in singles, doubles and mixed doubles and has competed at five Commonwealth Games, winning 5 bronze medals as follows: the team event in the 1986 Commonwealth Games, in both the team event and mixed doubles at the 1994 Commonwealth Games and also in both the women's teams event and mixed doubles at the Kuala Lumpur Games four years later.

Cator was the Australian badminton assistant coach at the 2006 Commonwealth Games and team manager at the 2008 Summer Olympics., 2010 Commonwealth Games and 2014 Commonwealth Games.

References

External links
 
 
 
 
 
 

1966 births
Living people
Australian female badminton players
Olympic badminton players of Australia
Badminton players at the 1992 Summer Olympics
Badminton players at the 1996 Summer Olympics
Badminton players at the 2000 Summer Olympics
Commonwealth Games bronze medallists for Australia
Commonwealth Games medallists in badminton
Badminton players at the 1990 Commonwealth Games
Badminton players at the 1994 Commonwealth Games
Badminton players at the 1998 Commonwealth Games
Badminton players at the 2002 Commonwealth Games
Sportswomen from Victoria (Australia)
Medallists at the 1986 Commonwealth Games
Medallists at the 1994 Commonwealth Games
Medallists at the 1998 Commonwealth Games